Jack Sharp may refer to:

Jack Sharp (1878-1938), English cricketer and footballer
Jack Sharp (New Zealand footballer), New Zealand international football (soccer) player
Jack Sharp (Scottish footballer) ( 1910s), Scottish footballer with Heart of Midlothian
 J. W. Sharp (c. 1818–1856), known as Jack, English singer and comic entertainer
Aaron John Sharp (1904–1997), American botanist
 Jack Sharp, pen name of writer Andy Weir

See also
Jack Sharpe (disambiguation)
John Sharp (disambiguation)